Into the Rain is the first album by Music for Pleasure and was released in 1982.

Track listing

Polydor Records LP: POLS 1070

Personnel
Mark Copson - vocals
Christopher Oldroyd - drums and percussion
Ivor Roberts - bass guitar
David Whitaker - keyboards and synthesizers

Production
Mike Hedges/Music for Pleasure - producer
Graham Carmichael - assistant engineer
Rob O'Connor/Stylorouge - sleeve
Tony Stone Associates - photo

References

1982 debut albums
Albums produced by Mike Hedges
Polydor Records albums
Music for Pleasure (band) albums